Adamczak is a Polish surname. Notable people with the surname include:
 Monique Adamczak (born 1983), Australian tennis player
 Stefan Adamczak (1892-1939), Polish athlete

See also

References 

Polish-language surnames